Androcalva is a genus of flowering plants in the family Malvaceae. The genus was first formally described in 2011 and comprises species formerly included in Commersonia (22) and Rulingia (4) as well as 7 new species.

The following is a list of species accepted by the Australian Plant Census as of March 2023:

Androcalva adenothalia C.F.Wilkins
Androcalva aphrix C.F.Wilkins
Androcalva argentea  (Guymer) C.F.Wilkins & Whitlock
Androcalva beeronensis  (Guymer) C.F.Wilkins & Whitlock
Androcalva bivillosa C.F.Wilkins
Androcalva crispa  (Turcz.) C.F.Wilkins & Whitlock - crisped leaf commersonia
Androcalva cuneata  (Turcz.) C.F.Wilkins & Whitlock
Androcalva fragifolia C.F.Wilkins
Androcalva fraseri  (J.Gay) C.F.Wilkins & Whitlock - blackfellow's hemp, brush kurrajong
Androcalva gaudichaudii (J.Gay) C.F.Wilkins & Whitlock
Androcalva incilis C.F.Wilkins
Androcalva inglewoodensis  (Guymer) C.F.Wilkins & Whitlock
Androcalva johnsonii  (Guymer) C.F.Wilkins & Whitlock
Androcalva lachna C.F.Wilkins
Androcalva leichhardtii  (Benth.) C.F.Wilkins & Whitlock
Androcalva leiperi  (Guymer) C.F.Wilkins & Whitlock
Androcalva loxophylla  (F.Muell.) C.F.Wilkins & Whitlock
Androcalva luteiflora  (E.Pritz.) C.F.Wilkins & Whitlock
Androcalva melanopetala (F.Muell.) C.F.Wilkins & Whitlock
Androcalva microphylla  (Benth.) C.F.Wilkins & Whitlock
Androcalva multiloba  (C.F.Wilkins & Whitlock) C.F.Wilkins & Whitlock
Androcalva pearnii (Guymer) C.F.Wilkins & Whitlock
Androcalva pedleyi (Guymer) C.F.Wilkins & Whitlock
Androcalva perkinsiana (Guymer) C.F.Wilkins & Whitlock
Androcalva perlaria C.F.Wilkins
Androcalva procumbens (Maiden & Betche)  C.F.Wilkins & Whitlock
Androcalva pulchella (Turcz.) C.F.Wilkins & Whitlock
Androcalva reticulata (Guymer) C.F.Wilkins & Whitlock
Androcalva rosea  (S.A.J.Bell & L.M.Copel.)  C.F.Wilkins & Whitlock
Androcalva rossii (Guymer) C.F.Wilkins & Whitlock - blackfellow's hemp
Androcalva stowardii  (S.Moore) C.F.Wilkins & Whitlock
Androcalva tatei  (F.Muell. ex Tate) C.F.Wilkins & Whitlock - trailing commersonia
Androcalva viscidula  (Guymer) C.F.Wilkins & Whitlock

References

 
Malvales of Australia
Malvaceae genera
Plants described in 2011
Taxa named by Carolyn F. Wilkins
Taxa named by Barbara Ann Whitlock